Dickson was a settlement in the U.S. state of Alaska. Situated in the Nome Census Area on the Seward Peninsula, it was located directly opposite Solomon, on the east bank of the Solomon River.  It was the coastal terminus of the Council City and Solomon River Railroad. All of its industries and inhabitants were connected with the railroad, and at its peak the town featured  five saloons, six restaurants and other establishments. Established in 1903, it was named for T. Warren Dickson, general manager of the Western Alaska Construction Company, which built the railroad. By 1910, its population was approximately 50 residents.

References

1903 establishments in Alaska
Former populated places in Alaska
Ghost towns in Alaska
Populated places in Nome Census Area, Alaska
Populated places established in 1903
Ghost towns in the United States
Ghost towns in North America
Towns in the United States